Shabla Municipality is a municipality (obshtina) in Dobrich Province, Bulgaria, located in the north-easternmost part of the country on the Northern Bulgarian Black Sea Coast in Southern Dobruja geographical region, bounded by Romania to the north. It is named after its administrative centre - the town of Shabla.

The area is best known with Cape Shabla - Bulgaria's easternmost point as well as the natural reserve of Durankulak Lake.
The main road E87 crosses the municipality connecting the port of Varna with the Romanian port of Konstanza.

Settlements 

Shabla Municipality includes the following 16 places (towns are shown in bold):

Demography 
The following table shows the change of the population during the last four decades.

Religion 
According to the latest Bulgarian census of 2011, the religious composition, among those who answered the optional question on religious identification, was the following:

See also
Provinces of Bulgaria
Municipalities of Bulgaria
List of cities and towns in Bulgaria

References

Municipalities in Dobrich Province